Hombale Films (pronunciation: Hom-Baa-Lay) is an Indian film production company mainly known for the K.G.F franchise and Kantara. It was founded by Vijay Kiragandur and named by Puneeth Rajkumar, who collaborated with the company on 3 films.

History 
Hombale Films was founded by  Vijay Kiragandur and Chaluve Gowda, entrepreneurs from Bangalore. Hombale Film's first production endeavour was the Kannada film Ninnindale in 2014, starring Puneeth Rajkumar. Their next venture was Masterpiece, starring Yash, in 2015. Their third venture Raajakumara was directed by Santhosh Ananddram, and became the top grossing Kannada film at the time. It reportedly grossed more than Rs. 75 crores in the Karnataka box office and was an industry hit.

Hombale Films' fourth film was K.G.F: Chapter 1 directed by Prashanth Neel of Ugramm fame. This film was released in five languages across India: Kannada, Telugu, Tamil, Malayalam, and Hindi. K.G.F: Chapter 1 was very successful at the box office, becoming the first Kannada film to enter the Rs. 200 crore club worldwide, and  collected more than 250 crores.

Hombale Films' next venture was Yuvarathnaa in 2021, which marked their third collaboration with Puneeth Rajkumar, and second collaboration with director Santhosh Ananddram. Yuvarathnaa released on 1 April 2021 in Kannada and Telugu, and was made available on Amazon Prime Video shortly after due to the COVID-19 pandemic. Yuvarathnaa marked Hombale Films' first foray into music production, under the label Hombale Music.

Hombale Films' next film was K.G.F: Chapter 2 directed by Prashanth Neel, which is the sequel to K.G.F: Chapter 1, which was released in 2018. Yash reprised his lead role from the first film and Hindi actor Sanjay Dutt was the antagonist, marking his debut in Kannada. The film released on 14 April 2022 in 5 languages with extraordinary reports and collected more than ₹1200 Crore (₹12 Billion) from worldwide box-office.

Hombale Films produced Kantara, directed by Rishabh Shetty, on September 30, 2022. It has currently grossed 400 crores in Kannada.

Upcoming films 

 Raghavendra Stores - Since 1972, directed by Santhosh Ananddram and starring Jaggesh, movie is releasing in 2023.
 Hombale Films is producing the Malayalam film Tyson starring Prithviraj Sukumaran, written by Murali Gopy and directed by Prithviraj Sukumaran himself.
 As of 2022, Hombale Films are also working with Prashant Neel for Salaar, an upcoming Indian film starring Prabhas and Shruti Haasan. 
 They are also working with Dr. Suri for Bagheera, starring Sriimurali and written by Prashant Neel.
 Hombale Films's fourth collaboration with Puneeth Rajkumar was supposed to be marked by Dvitva, which was to be directed by Pawan Kumar of Lucia fame.
 Another film titled as Richard Anthony - Lord of the Sea written and directed by Rakshith Shetty was announced, serving as a prequel and sequel to Rakshith's directorial debut film Ulidavaru Kandanthe.

Filmography

References

External links 

Film production companies based in Bangalore
Mass media companies established in 2014
2014 establishments in Karnataka
Indian companies established in 2014